Pope Clement VIII (r. 1592–1605) created 53 cardinals in six consistories.

17 September 1593

 Lucio Sassi - Cardinal Priest
 Francisco de Toledo Herrera, S.J. - Cardinal Priest
 Pietro Aldobrandini - Cardinal Bishop
 Cinzio Passeri Aldobrandini - Cardinal Priest

5 June 1596

 Silvio Savelli
 Lorenzo Priuli
 Francesco Maria Tarugi
 Ottavio Bandini
 Francesco Cornaro, iuniore
 Anne d'Escars de Givry
 Gian Francesco Biandrate di San Giorgio Aldobrandini
 Camillo Borghese
 Caesar Baronius
 Lorenzo Bianchetti
 Francisco de Ávila
 Fernando Niño de Guevara
 Bartolomeo Cesi
 Francesco Mantica
 Pompeio Arrigoni
 Andrea Baroni Peretti Montalto

18 December 1596

 Philipp of Bavaria

3 March 1599

 Bonifazio Bevilacqua Aldobrandini - Cardinal Bishop
 Bernardo de Sandoval y Rojas - Cardinal Priest
 Alfonso Visconti - Cardinal Priest
 Domenico Toschi - Cardinal Priest
 Arnaud d'Ossat - Cardinal Priest
 Paolo Emilio Zacchia - Cardinal Priest
 Franz Seraph von Dietrichstein - Cardinal Priest
 Silvio Antoniano - Cardinal Priest
 S. Robert Francis Romulus Bellarmine, S.J. - Cardinal Priest
 Bonviso Bonvisi - Cardinal Priest
 François de Sourdis - Cardinal Deacon, then elevated to Cardinal Priest
 Alessandro d'Este - Cardinal Priest
 Giovanni Battista Deti - Cardinal Deacon, then elevated to Cardinal Priest, finally elevated to Cardinal Bishop

17 September 1603

 Silvestro Aldobrandini

9 June 1604

 Séraphin Olivier-Razali
 Domenico Ginnasi
 Antonio Zapata y Cisneros
 Filippo Spinelli
 Carlo Conti
 Bernard Maciejowski
 Carlo Gaudenzio Madruzzo
 Jacques Davy Duperron
 Innocenzo del Bufalo-Cancellieri
 Giovanni Delfino
 Giacomo Sannesio
 Erminio Valenti
 Girolamo Agucchi
 Girolamo Pamphilj
 Ferdinando Taverna
 Anselmo Marzato
 Giovanni Doria
 Carlo Emanuele Pio di Savoia

References

Clement 8
College of Cardinals
16th-century Catholicism
17th-century Catholicism